The 1988–89 Syracuse Orangemen basketball team represented Syracuse University in the 1988–89 NCAA Division I men's basketball season.  The Head coach was Jim Boeheim, serving for his 13th year.  The team played home games at the Carrier Dome in Syracuse, New York.  The team finished with a 30–8 (10–6) record while making it to the Midwest Regional Final of the NCAA tournament.

The team was led by senior Sherman Douglas and junior Derrick Coleman.

Roster

Schedule and results

|-
!colspan=8| Big East tournament

|-
!colspan=8| NCAA tournament

Rankings

^Coaches did not release a Week 1 poll.
*AP does not release post-NCAA Tournament rankings

1989 NBA draft

References

Syracuse Orange
Syracuse Orange men's basketball seasons
Syracuse
Syracuse Orange
Syracuse Orange